Staffan Olsson (born 21 February 1969), better known by his stage name Bosson, is a Swedish singer-songwriter.

Early life
His stage name comes from the fact that his father's first name is Bo – hence he is Bo's son.

Career
Bosson first gained nationwide fame in Sweden when he imitated Michael Jackson in the first season of Sikta mot stjärnorna, performing "Black or White" and winning his semi-final. His big break as a solo artist came when composing and performing the song "One in a Million", from the album One in a Million, which became a Top 10 hit in Europe and Asia in 2000 and 2001, which also appeared in the film Miss Congeniality. He wrote it for his then-girlfriend Jessica Olérs, Miss Sweden 1998, and was nominated for a Golden Globe.

Two years later, the successful follow-up Rockstar was released, and in June 2007, he released his fourth album Future's Gone Tomorrow / Life Is Here Today and in June 2013, he released his fifth album Best of 11-Twelve. He served as an opening act for Britney Spears during her tour in 2000, and has toured with Kylie Minogue. He has also written songs for Amy Grant and the famous guitarist Al Di Meola. As well as in his native Sweden, Bosson has achieved huge success and toured extensively in countries like Russia, Ukraine, Belarus and Kazakhstan. He also performed with Dima Bilan.

Discography

Studio albums

Compilation albums

Singles

Collaborations
 2002: Emma Andersson featuring Bosson – Weightless
 2009: Elizma Theron featuring Bosson – One in a Million
 2016: Sunbeat featuring Bosson – Eagle in the Sky
 2017: Edgar featuring Bosson – My Love

Filmography

References

External links
 
 Official Russian website
 Fan site

1969 births
Living people
Swedish pop singers
Swedish male singers
Swedish singer-songwriters
Melodifestivalen contestants of 2004